Hatpipalya is a town and a Nagar parishad in the Hatpipliya tehsil within Dewas district of the state of Madhya Pradesh, India.

Geography

Climate 
Hatpipliya lies on the Malwa Plateau. Due of its high elevation and inland location, even during the hottest months of the year, the nights are relatively cool, which is known as Shab-e-Malwa. Three distinct seasons are observed: summer, monsoon and winter.

Demographics

Males constitute 52% of the population and females 48%. Hatpipalya has an average literacy rate of 78.23%, male literacy is 87.31%, and female literacy is 68.74%. In Hatpipalya, 13.88% of the population is under 6 years of age.

Government and politics

Civic administration
Hatpipliya is administered by a Nagar Parishad (Municipal Council). Its responsibilities include sanitation, street lights, maintenance of birth and death records.

Representation in Parliament and State Assembly 
At the state level, Hatpipliya falls within the Hatpipliya Assembly constituency, which covers most of the surrounding tehsil. As of November 2020, its representative in the Vidhan Sabha is Manoj Choudhary of the Bharatiya Janata Party.

At the national level, the city is falls within the Dewas (Lok Sabha constituency). As of 2019, its Member of Parliament is 	Mahendra Solanki of the Bharatiya Janata Party.

Law and order 
The Dewas Police, a division of the Madhya Pradesh Police, under the direct control of Department of Home Affairs, Government of Madhya Pradesh is the law enforcement agency in Dewas. Dewas district is divided into 19 police stations and six police outposts. Hatpipliya itself has one police station.

Civic Utility / Amenities 
Amongst the medical facilities, it had 8 medical shops and 1 dispensary with 6 beds. Amongst the social, recreational and cultural facilities it had 1 theatre and 3 auditorium/community halls. It had 6 bank branches. 

Famous persons
 Kailash Chandra Joshi, the 9th Chief Minister of Madhya Pradesh in the 1970s.

Education
As of the 2011 census,  Hatpipliya had 11 primary schools, 2 middle schools, 5 secondary schools, 4 senior secondary schools, 1 degree-level college and 1 non-formal education centre.

See also
 Hatpipliya Assembly constituency

References

Cities and towns in Dewas district